A lakh (abbreviated L; sometimes written lac) is a unit in the Indian numbering system equal to one hundred thousand (100,000; scientific notation: 105).  In the Indian 2,2,3 convention of digit grouping, it is written as 1,00,000. For example, in India, 150,000 rupees becomes 1.5 lakh rupees, written as 1,50,000 or INR 1,50,000.

It is widely used both in official and other contexts in Afghanistan, Bangladesh, Bhutan, India, Myanmar, Nepal, Pakistan, and Sri Lanka. It is often used in Bangladeshi, Indian, Pakistani, and Sri Lankan English.

Usage
In Indian English, the word is used both as an attributive and non-attributive noun with either an unmarked or marked ("-s") plural, respectively. For example: "1 lakh people"; "lakhs of people"; "20 lakh rupees"; "lakhs of rupees". In the abbreviated form, usage such as "5L" or "5 lac" (for "5 lakh rupees") is common. In this system of numeration, 100 lakh is called one crore and is equal to 10 million.

Silver market
The term is also used in the pricing of silver on the international precious metals market, where one lakh equals  of silver.

Etymology and regional variants

Another possible etymology comes from the root word for the lac bug, used to produce shellac.

 In Assamese:  lokhyo, or  lakh
 In Bengali: natively (tadbhava) known as  lākh, though some use the ardha-tatsama  lokkho.
 In Hindi:  lākh
 In Dhivehi: ލައްކަ la'kha
 In Gujarati:  lākh
 In Kannada:  lakṣha
 In Kashmiri:  lachh
 In Khasi: lak
 In Malayalam:  laksham
 In Marathi:  lākh/laksha
 In Meitei: ꯂꯥꯛ lāk
 In Nepali:  lākh
 In Odia:  lôkhyô
 In Punjabi: (Shahmukhi: ,) lakkh
 In Sinhala:  
 In Tamil:  latcham
 In Telugu:  lakṣha
 In Urdu:  lākh

See also
 Crore
 English numerals
 Myriad
 Names of large numbers

References

External links

 

Powers of ten
Units of amount
Hindi words and phrases
Urdu-language words and phrases
Indian English idioms
Pakistani English idioms
Bengali words and phrases
Customary units in India